The bell pepper (also known as paprika, sweet pepper, pepper, or capsicum ) is the fruit of plants in the Grossum Group of the species Capsicum annuum. Cultivars of the plant produce fruits in different colors, including red, yellow, orange, green, white, chocolate, candy cane striped, and purple. Bell peppers are sometimes grouped with less pungent chili varieties as "sweet peppers".  While they are fruits—botanically classified as berries—they are commonly used as a vegetable ingredient or side dish. Other varieties of the genus Capsicum are categorized as chili peppers when they are cultivated for their pungency, including some varieties of Capsicum annuum.

Peppers are native to Mexico, Central America, the Caribbean and northern South America. Pepper seeds were imported to Spain in 1493 and then spread through Europe and Asia. The mild bell pepper cultivar was developed in the 1920s, in Szeged, Hungary.

Nomenclature

The name pepper was given by Europeans when Christopher Columbus brought the plant back to Europe. At that time, black pepper (peppercorns), from the unrelated plant Piper nigrum originating from India, was a highly prized condiment. The name pepper was applied in Europe to all known spices with a hot and pungent taste and was therefore extended to genus Capsicum when it was introduced from the Americas. The most commonly used name of the plant family, chile, is of Mexican origin, from the Nahuatl word chilli.

The terms bell pepper (US, Canada, Philippines), pepper or sweet pepper (UK, Ireland, Canada, South Africa, Zimbabwe), and capsicum (Australia, Bangladesh, India, Malaysia, New Zealand, Pakistan and Sri Lanka) are often used for any of the large bell-shaped peppers, regardless of their color. The fruit is simply referred to as a "pepper", or additionally by color ("green pepper" or red, yellow, orange, purple, brown, black). In the Midland region of the U.S., bell peppers, either fresh or when stuffed and pickled, are sometimes called mangoes.

In some languages, the term paprika, which has its roots in the word for pepper, is used for both the spice and the fruit – sometimes referred to by their color (for example groene paprika, gele paprika, in Dutch, which are green and yellow, respectively). The bell pepper is called "パプリカ" (papurika) or "ピーマン" (pīman, from French piment pronounced with a silent 't') in Japan. In Switzerland, the fruit is mostly called peperone, which is the Italian name of the fruit. In France, it is called poivron, with the same root as poivre (meaning "pepper") or piment. In Spain it is called pimiento morrón, the masculine form of the traditional spice, pimienta and "morrón" (snouted) referring to its general shape. In South Korea, the word "피망" (pimang from the French piment) refers to green bell peppers, whereas "파프리카" (papeurika, from paprika) refers to bell peppers of other colors. In Sri Lanka, both the bell pepper and the banana pepper are referred to as a "capsicum" since the bell pepper has no Sinhalese translation. In Argentina and Chile, it is called "morrón".

Colors

The most common colors of bell peppers are green, yellow, orange and red. Other colors include brown, white, lavender, and dark purple, depending on the variety. Most typically, unripe fruits are green or, less commonly, pale yellow or purple. Red bell peppers are simply ripened green peppers, although the Permagreen variety maintains its green color even when fully ripe. As such, mixed colored peppers also exist during parts of the ripening process.

Use as a food

Nutrition
A raw red bell pepper is 94% water, 5% carbohydrates, 1% protein, and contains negligible fat. A 100 gram (3.5 oz) reference amount supplies 26 calories, and is a rich source of vitamin C  containing 158% of the Daily Value (DV)  vitamin A (20%), and vitamin B6 (23% DV), with moderate contents of riboflavin (12%), folate (12% DV), and vitamin E (11% DV). A red bell pepper supplies twice the vitamin C and eight times the vitamin A content of a green bell pepper.

Like the tomato, bell peppers are botanical fruits but culinary vegetables. Pieces of bell pepper are commonly used in garden salads and as toppings on pizza. There are many varieties of stuffed peppers prepared using hollowed or halved bell peppers. Bell peppers (and other cultivars of Capsicum annuum) may be used in the production of the spice paprika.

The bell pepper is the only member of the genus Capsicum that does not produce capsaicin, a lipophilic chemical that can cause a strong burning sensation when it comes in contact with mucous membranes. They are thus scored in the lowest level of the Scoville scale, meaning that they are not spicy. This absence of capsaicin is due to a recessive form of a gene that eliminates the compound and, consequently, the "hot" taste usually associated with the rest of the genus Capsicum. This recessive gene is overwritten in the Mexibelle pepper, a hybrid variety of bell pepper that produces small amounts of capsaicin (and is thus mildly pungent). Sweet pepper cultivars produce non-pungent capsaicinoids.

Production 
In 2020, global production of bell peppers was 36 million tonnes, led by China with 46% of the total, and secondary production by Mexico, Indonesia, and Turkey. The United States ranks 5th in total production, as it produces approximately 1.6 billion pounds annually.

See also 

 List of Capsicum cultivars
 Stuffed peppers

References 

Chili peppers
Crops originating from the Americas
Capsicum cultivars
Crops
Romani cuisine